Bruno Bošnjak (born 9 July 1983) is a snowboarder who became Croatia's first medalist at any Winter Paralympics. Later Dino Sokolović won gold for their country. His disability came from an injury during a qualifying race for the 2006 Winter Olympics and exacerbated by a later bicycle injury.

References

External links 
 
 Bruno Bosnjak at World Para Snowboard
 

1983 births
Sportspeople from Zagreb
Living people
Croatian male snowboarders
Paralympic snowboarders of Croatia
Paralympic medalists in snowboarding
Paralympic bronze medalists for Croatia
Snowboarders at the 2018 Winter Paralympics
Snowboarders at the 2022 Winter Paralympics
Medalists at the 2018 Winter Paralympics